The 2018 Brisbane Broncos season is the 31st in the club's history. Coached by Wayne Bennett, and captained by Darius Boyd, they  completed the NRL's 2018 Telstra Premiership regular season in the number six position, qualifying for the  finals. They were defeated in the 2nd Elimination Final by St George-Illawarra and did not progress further.

Movements 
Source:

Gains

Losses

Ladder

Fixtures

Regular season

References

Brisbane Broncos seasons
Brisbane Broncos season
2018 NRL Women's season